This is a list of R.S.C. Anderlecht managers from 1920 when the first manager was appointed, to the present day.

Managers

References

Anderlecht